Calytrix tenuiramea is a species of plant in the myrtle family Myrtaceae that is endemic to Western Australia.

Description
It usually blooms between December and March producing purple star-shaped flowers.

Distribution
Found near lakes in the South West and Wheatbelt regions of Western Australia where it grows in sandy soils.

References

tenuiramea
Endemic flora of Western Australia
Myrtales of Australia
Rosids of Western Australia
Plants described in 1867
Taxa named by George Bentham